Richmond Heights is a city in Cuyahoga County, Ohio, United States. The population was 10,546 at the 2010 census.

Geography
Richmond Heights is located at  (41.558183, -81.503651). Richmond Heights borders Euclid on the west, Lyndhurst and South Euclid on the south, Highland Heights on the east, and Willoughby Hills to the north.

Demographics

82.7% spoke English, 4.8% Russian, 3.1% Spanish, 1.9% Slovene, 1.7% Italian, 1.2% Chinese, and 1.1% Croatian.

Of the city's population over the age of 25, 38.5% held a bachelor's degree or higher.

2010 census
As of the census of 2010, there were 10,546 people, 4,766 households, and 2,812 families living in the city. The racial makeup of the city was 48.5% White, 44.9% African American, 0.1% Native American, 4.3% Asian, 0.5% from other races, and 1.8% from two or more races. Hispanic or Latino of any race were 1.8% of the population.

There were 4,766 households, of which 23.7% had children under the age of 18 living with them, 40.6% were married couples living together, 14.8% had a female householder with no husband present, 3.7% had a male householder with no wife present, and 41.0% were non-families. 36.4% of all households were made up of individuals, and 13.8% had someone living alone who was 65 years of age or older. The average household size was 2.17 and the average family size was 2.84.

The median age in the city was 46.1 years. 18.4% of residents were under the age of 18; 7.9% were between the ages of 18 and 24; 22% were from 25 to 44; 31% were from 45 to 64; and 20.5% were 65 years of age or older. The gender makeup of the city was 44.9% male and 55.1% female.

2000 census
As of the census of 2000, there were 10,944 people, 4,864 households, and 2,971 families living in the city. The population density was 2,504.4 people per square mile (966.9/km). There were 5,060 housing units at an average density of 1,157.9 per square mile (447.1/km). The racial makeup of the city was 68.98% White, 23.87% Black, 0.05% Native American, 4.74% Asian, 0.04% Pacific Islander, 0.65% from other races, and 1.67% from two or more races. Hispanic or Latino of any race were 1.58% of the population.

There were 4,864 households, out of which 24.1% had children under the age of 18 living with them, 45.7% were married couples living together, 12.3% had a female householder with no husband present, and 38.9% were non-families. 33.9% of all households were made up of individuals, and 10.0% had someone living alone who was 65 years of age or older. The average household size was 2.22 and the average family size was 2.85.

In the city the population was spread out, with 19.7% under the age of 18, 7.7% from 18 to 24, 29.6% from 25 to 44, 25.3% from 45 to 64, and 17.7% who were 65 years of age or older. The median age was 41 years. For every 100 females, there were 89.4 males. For every 100 females age 18 and over, there were 85.3 males.

The median income for a household in the city was $43,625, and the median income for a family was $60,136. Males had a median income of $40,414 versus $30,537 for females. The per capita income for the city was $25,738. About 4.3% of families and 5.3% of the population were below the poverty line, including 6.9% of those under age 18 and 2.7% of those age 65 or over.

Residential areas
Some popular developments include the Richmond Bluffs, near the Cuyahoga County Airport, off Richmond Road, the Rushmore Subdivision, off of Highland Road, and Richwood, south of the Richmond-Highland Roads intersection. The largest residential area in Richmond Heights is the Scottish Highlands, off of Highland Road. Many ranch-style homes are found throughout the area.

Many apartments are also located in Richmond Heights. Some major complexes are located throughout the Loganberry section of Richmond Heights (between Brush Road and Chestnut Lane on Chardon Road, or Route 6).

History
Originally a part of Euclid Township, Richmond Heights was founded as the Village of Claribel in 1917, but was later renamed as Richmond Heights in 1918.

School system
Richmond Heights has a local school district. Richmond Heights High School has a total enrollment of 335 students, with 58% of students of African American descent, 36% Caucasian, 3% Asian American, 2% multiracial, and 1% Hispanic. The mascot is the Spartans and the colors are stated officially as royal blue and white. As of recently, the Richmond Heights Schools had been struggling to pass levies on the school, thus leading to strike from teachers of the schools, demanding more pay, and loss of transportation, bands, and now a "pay-to-play" situation in all sports.

Richmond Heights recently did pass a levy in 2009 that will provide the school with more tax dollars from the city, thus bringing back possible transportation for the students.

See also
 Richmond Town Square

References

External links

 City of Richmond Heights

Cities in Ohio
Cities in Cuyahoga County, Ohio
Populated places established in 1917